Aditya Pudipeddi (born 23 December 1989), better known as Aadi Saikumar, is an Indian actor who works in Telugu films. Aadi made his debut with Prema Kavali (2011). He won the Filmfare Award for Best Male Debut – South and SIIMA Award for Best Male Debut (Telugu) for the film. He went on to be starred in successful films such as Lovely (2012), Sukumarudu (2013),  Pyar Mein Padipoyane (2014), Shamantakamani (2017), Operation Gold Fish (2019), and Tees Maar Khan (2022).

Early life
Aditya Pudipeddi was born on 23 December 1989 in Amudalavalasa, Srikakulam district, Andhra Pradesh. Son of actor Sai Kumar, Aadi was schooled in Chennai in Padma Sheshadri till 7th standard and then moved to St. Andrews School in Hyderabad, followed by St Johns for Intermediate and completed his graduation from Bhavan's Vivekananda College. He excelled in studies, and had an inclination towards acting. He was an all-rounder in Cricket and he was selected for the under-19 Ranji Cricket Team. He played under the captaincy of Ambati Rayudu, and Pragyan Ojha, the Indian Team player was his roommate during their Sri Lanka trip.

Aadi married Aruna, a software professional from Rajahmundry, in December 2014, and the couple has a daughter.

Career
Aadi debuted in 2011 with K. Vijaya Bhaskar's directorial Prema Kavali. In this love story, he played the role of Srinu, a NCC Cadet who sets out to find the one who tortures his lover, thus trying to regain her heart after a break-up. Oneindia Entertainment commented on his performance stating "Aadi has done his role with good ease and his in dialogue delivery is as good as his father. He is quite comfortable in emoting the love and emotional scenes and he is also good at dances and action scenes. However, he should further improve his body language, as he appeared a little rigid in some scenes. But for a debutant hero, such situations are unavoidable." Aadi has won the Hyderabad Times award 2011 for Promising Newcomer Male, CineMAA Awards (2012) for best Debut Actor of 2012 and Filmfare Awards South (2012) for Best Male Debut – South of 2011. The movie ran for 100 days.

His next release was B. Jaya's directorial Lovely (2012), was released on 30 March 2012. He played the role of Akash, a jovial person who hates father-daughter relationships, but starts respecting it after he meets with the father of the girl he loved. The film completed a hundred-day run on 7 July 2012 in 12 centres. In 2013, Aadi starred in Sukumarudu which was released on 4 May 2013 which was moderately successful. He then starred in Rough, directed by C. H. Subba Reddy.

Filmography

 All films are in Telugu, unless otherwise noted.

As singer

Awards and nominations

See also 
 List of Telugu actors

References

External links
 
 

Indian male film actors
Telugu male actors
Filmfare Awards South winners
Living people
South Indian International Movie Awards winners
People from Srikakulam district
1989 births
Male actors in Telugu cinema
Male actors from Andhra Pradesh